Bolivia is scheduled to compete at the 2017 World Aquatics Championships in Budapest, Hungary from 14 July to 30 July.

Open water swimming

Bolivia has entered two open water swimmers

Swimming

Bolivia has received a Universality invitation from FINA to send a maximum of four swimmers (two men and two women) to the World Championships.

References

Nations at the 2017 World Aquatics Championships
2017
World Aquatics Championships